Salisbury Township is one of the twelve townships of Meigs County, Ohio, United States.  The 2000 census found 6,441 people in the township, 1,950 of whom lived in the unincorporated portions of the township.

Geography
Located in the central part of the county along the Ohio River, it borders the following townships:
Bedford Township - north
Chester Township - northeast
Sutton Township - southeast
Cheshire Township, Gallia County - southwest
Rutland Township - west
Scipio Township - northwest corner

Mason County, West Virginia lies across the Ohio River to the south.

It is the farthest downstream of Meigs County's Ohio River townships.

Two villages are located along Salisbury Township's shoreline: Middleport, the largest village in the county, in the southwest, and Pomeroy, the county seat, in the southeast.

Name and history
It is the only Salisbury Township statewide.

Located off State Route 124 near Rock Springs, the Meigs County Fairgrounds is listed on the National Register of Historic Places.

Government
The township is governed by a three-member board of trustees, who are elected in November of odd-numbered years to a four-year term beginning on the following January 1. Two are elected in the year after the presidential election and one is elected in the year before it. There is also an elected township fiscal officer, who serves a four-year term beginning on April 1 of the year after the election, which is held in November of the year before the presidential election. Vacancies in the fiscal officership or on the board of trustees are filled by the remaining trustees.

References

External links
County website

Townships in Meigs County, Ohio
Townships in Ohio